The 2004 Brandenburg state election was held on 19 September 2004 to elect the members of the 4th Landtag of Brandenburg. The incumbent government of the Social Democratic Party (SPD) and Christian Democratic Union (CDU) led by Minister-President Matthias Platzeck was returned with a significantly reduced majority. The Party of Democratic Socialism (PDS) moved into second place, although polls prior to the election suggested it would become the largest party. The CDU fell to third place.

Background
The SPD had suffered losses in several state elections before Brandenburg. This was thought to be a consequence of the Agenda 2010 policy, a series of economic liberal economic reforms adopted by the federal SPD government led by Chancellor Gerhard Schröder. Many voters in eastern Germany turned to the Party of Democratic Socialism (PDS), while many in the west later turned to Labour and Social Justice, an SPD splinter party. In state elections, the SPD's growing unpopularity had chiefly benefited the CDU.

In Brandenburg, both Minister-President Matthias Platzeck (SPD) and his partner Jörg Schönbohm (CDU) supported Schröder's reforms. Both PDS and the German People's Union (DVU), which had entered the Landtag in 1999, campaigned in opposition.

Parties
The table below lists parties represented in the 3rd Landtag of Brandenburg.

Opinion polling

Election result

|-
! colspan="2" | Party
! Votes
! %
! +/-
! Seats 
! +/-
! Seats %
|-
| bgcolor=| 
| align=left | Social Democratic Party (SPD)
| align=right| 372,942
| align=right| 31.9
| align=right| 7.4
| align=right| 33
| align=right| 4
| align=right| 37.5
|-
| bgcolor=| 
| align=left | Party of Democratic Socialism (PDS)
| align=right| 326,801
| align=right| 28.0
| align=right| 4.7
| align=right| 29
| align=right| 7
| align=right| 33.0
|-
| bgcolor=| 
| align=left | Christian Democratic Union (CDU)
| align=right| 227,062
| align=right| 19.4
| align=right| 7.1
| align=right| 20
| align=right| 5
| align=right| 22.7
|-
| bgcolor=| 
| align=left | German People's Union (DVU)
| align=right| 71,041
| align=right| 6.0
| align=right| 0.8
| align=right| 6
| align=right| 1
| align=right| 6.8
|-
! colspan=8|
|-
| bgcolor=| 
| align=left | Alliance 90/The Greens (Grüne)
| align=right| 42,091
| align=right| 3.6
| align=right| 1.7
| align=right| 0
| align=right| ±0
| align=right| 0
|-
| bgcolor=| 
| align=left | Free Democratic Party (FDP)
| align=right| 38,890
| align=right| 3.3
| align=right| 1.4
| align=right| 0
| align=right| ±0
| align=right| 0
|-
| bgcolor=| 
| align=left | Family Party (FAMILIE)
| align=right| 30,843
| align=right| 2.6
| align=right| 2.6
| align=right| 0
| align=right| ±0
| align=right| 0
|-
| bgcolor=|
| align=left | Others
| align=right| 59,239
| align=right| 5.1
| align=right| 
| align=right| 0
| align=right| ±0
| align=right| 0
|-
! align=right colspan=2| Total
! align=right| 1,168,909
! align=right| 100.0
! align=right| 
! align=right| 88
! align=right| 1
! align=right| 
|-
! align=right colspan=2| Voter turnout
! align=right| 
! align=right| 56.4
! align=right| 2.1
! align=right| 
! align=right| 
! align=right| 
|}

Sources
 The Federal Returning Officer

2004
2004 elections in Germany